Little Big Master is a 2015 Hong Kong drama film co-written and directed by Adrian Kwan and starring Miriam Yeung and Louis Koo. The film is based on a true story where Lilian Lui, former headmistress of an elite kindergarten in Discovery Bay whom originally planned to retire to travel around the world with her husband Alvin Tse, takes up a job with a monthly salary of HK$4,500 to continue educating five remaining pupils single-handedly in Yuen Long's Yuen Kong Kindergarten, which was on the verge for closure in 2009, and puts her travel plans on hold. Little Big Master was a critical and commercial success, and was met with acclaim from audiences. It grossed HK$46.6 million at the Hong Kong box office and became the highest-grossing domestic film of 2015 in the territory.

Plot
Lui Wai-hung (Miriam Yeung) is a headmistress of an international kindergarten. Feeling disillusioned with the education system, she quits her high-paying job as a principal and plans to travel around the world with her husband Tse Wing-tung (Louis Koo). However, she puts her travel plans on hold when she sees a news report on television where Yuen Tin Kindergarten, located in Yuen Long, was on the verge of closure with only five students left. Also, due to financial difficulties, the school can only use HK$4,500 to hire a headmaster and staff. Rekindling her passion for teaching, Lui applies for the job and hopes to help the five children transfer to another school. When Headmistress Lui assumes office, she discovers that these five children have different family problems. Student Ka-ka's father (Philip Keung) was crippled during an accident and is often threatened by property developers with eviction; Mei-chu's parents were killed in a traffic accident, with Auntie Han (Anna Ng), a restaurant employee, as her only guardian; Siu-suet's mother was not approved for Hong Kong residency and lives with her elderly father Mr. Ho (Richard Ng), who sells metal scraps for a living; Pakistani sisters Kitty and Jennie's father does not see a need for girls to study, so when school bus prices increased, he simply did not allow his daughters to go to school anymore.

Faced with her students' problems, Lui does her best to help them, volunteering to pick up Kitty and Jennie for school and sorting out Ka-ka's family problems, among other things. At the same time, she also has to take care of school administrative duties and janitorial work. In addition, Lui reminds her students and their parents to set a goal for themselves, while her own goal is to be a teacher who never gives up. Later, when she finds out that she was unable to help her students transfer, she decides to recruit new students to the school. At this time, however, Lui suffers from a recurrence of an old tumor.

Cast
Miriam Yeung as Lui Wai-hung (呂慧紅), headmistress of Yuen Tin Kindergarten, based on Lilian Lui
Louis Koo as Tse Wing-tung (謝永東), Lui's husband who is a museum exhibition designer, based on Alvin Tse
Winnie Ho as Ho Siu-suet (何小雪), a student of Yuen Tin Kindergarten
Fu Shun-ying as Lo Ka-ka (盧嘉嘉), a student of Yuen Tin Kindergarten
Keira Wang as Tam Mei-chu (譚美珠), a student of Yuen Tin Kindergarten
Zaha Fathima as Kitty Fathima, a student of Yuen Tin Kindergarten
Khan Nayab as Jennie Fathima, a student of Yuen Tin Kindergarten
Richard Ng as Mr. Ho (何伯), Siu-suet's father
Anna Ng as Auntie Han (嫻姨), Mei-chu's aunt
Philip Keung as Lo Keung (盧強), Ka-ka's father
Rain Lau as Mrs. Lo (強嫂), Ka-ka's mother
Asnani Mena as Kitty and Jennie's mother
Dhillion Harjit Singh as Kitty and Jennie's father
Stanley Fung as Yuen Tin Village Office head
Marc Ma as estate agent
Fire Lee as Fung Tai-wai (馮大偉), Yuen Tin Village Rural Committee head
Bonnie Wong as a janitor
Alannah Ong as Yuen Tin Village Office head's wife
Sammy Leung as Bowie Chin (錢寶宜), an old business friend of Lui whom is referred as the "Education King"
Mimi Kung as Anita, teacher at King Kids International Kindergarten
Ho Chun-ting as Martin Tong
Ho Hing-fai as Martin's father
Sin Kam as Martin's mother
Chun Wong as Store Wong (士多黃)
Fung So-po as Lui Wai-hung's mother
Stephen Au as Lui Wai-hung's older brother
Cindy Au as Lui Wai-hung's sister in-law
Gregory Charles Rivers as Tony, museum manager
Don Li as Kit (傑仔), museum staff
Li Shing-cheong as a restaurant manager

Reception

Critical
Maggie Lee of Variety gave the film a positive review and states the film "has a humongous heart." Clarence Tsui of The Hollywood Reporter also gave the film a positive review praising director Adrian Kwan's sincerity and performances by leading cast members Miriam Yeung and Louis Koo, while also praising performances by the film's child actors and refers the film as "an optimism-fueled film reliant more on sentimental brushstrokes than sharp social critique in presenting and understanding the tragedy and joy on screen." Yvonne Teh of South China Morning Post gave the film a score of four stars out of five and praises the film's story as "dramatic gold".

As per mixed review, Derek Elley of Film Business Asia gave a score of six out of ten praising the performances by the cast and criticizes the lack of real drama and conflict.

Box office
Little Big Master opened on 19 March 2015 in Hong Kong where it topped the box office for two consecutive weeks, earning a total of HK$16.1 million (US$2.07 million) after two weekends plus early previews. After twenty days of release, the film grossed HK$32.3 million (US$4.17 million). By the fourth weekend, Little Big Master remained in second place where it grossed a total of HK$39.3 million (US$5.07 million). By the end of its theatrical run, the film grossed a total of HK$46.6 million (US$6.01 million), making it the highest grossing domestic film and fifth highest grossing film overall of 2015 in Hong Kong.

Accolades

References

External links

2015 films
2015 drama films
Hong Kong drama films
2010s Cantonese-language films
Drama films based on actual events
Films set in Hong Kong
Films shot in Hong Kong
Films set in schools
2010s Hong Kong films